Saint-Narcisse is a parish municipality located in the regional county municipality (MRC) Chenaux, in the administrative region of Mauricie, in the province of Quebec, in Canada.

Geography

The territory also includes the "lake Morin" (popularly referred to as "Petit lac" - Little Lake) which is located north of the Grande Ligne (Great Line). A line of mountains crosses the municipal territory along its entire length, separating the plate of Middle Mauricie with the plain of the Lower Mauricie.

Its watershed is mostly part of the Batiscanie, except the southwest area, the limit of Champlain and of Saint-Luc-de-Vincennes. The municipality is crossed by five rivers: Batiscan River, River des Chutes (River of the falls), Rivière-au-Lard (Bacon River), Rivière-aux-Fourches (River of the forks), and Rivière La Tortue (Turtle River). Then the river continues to flow in Saint-Séverin to go jump into the Rivière des Envies (River cravings).

Wetland
A sector of wetland covering three municipalities, is located south-east of Lac-à-la-Tortue, head of water between the watershed of Lac-à-la-Tortue (including the outlet of Lake Atocas), the rivière à la Tortue (Turtle River) and "Rivière des chutes" (River des Chutes):
 Row "Cote Saint-Pierre Coté Sud-Ouest", a few lands in the southeast of Hérouxville and a dozen lands of Saint-Narcisse;
 Row "Cote Saint-Pierre Coté Northeast" in Saint-Narcisse, a few limited and isolated wetlands covering about 14 lots (near the road linking the Lac-à-la-Tortue  and Saint-Narcisse);
 Row X 's in Hérouxville, some isolated areas at the southeast of the row, spread on eight lots;
 Row IX Lac-à-la-Tortue in Radnor Township, three lots (near the limit of Hérouxville);
 Forefront of Radnor in Saint-Narcisse, north-east of the row, is the head area of the River des Chutes.

History

The first pioneer Louis Cosset, came from Sainte-Geneviève-de-Batiscan, was established in Saint-Narcisse about 1804. Among the other early settlers, many came from the neighboring parishes of St. Lawrence River. The settlement expansion forced the new pioneers to cross a moraine an estimated one kilometer wide. This moraine path of the Mauricie, between Saint-Paulin at the west end and Saint-Raymond at the East end, is about 120 kilometers long. It is referred to as "Saint-Narcisse Moraine" because this moraine is more prominent at the height of Saint-Narcisse. This geological formation was shaped about 11,000 years ago, at the end of the last glacial period, with the deposition of various layers of rock at the foot of the gigantic glaciers.

Toponymy
The town was named in honour of Saint Narcissus. A statue of Saint-Narcisse sits atop the main altar of the church of Saint-Narcisse. Narcisse was born in Palestine in the late first century of the Christian era. Third Bishop of Jerusalem, he was appointed bishop at the age of 80 years. With Theophilus of Caesarea, he presided in the year 195 a council under the auspices of Pope Victor.

Solidarity Fair (August) 

From August 1982 until 2012, the community of Saint-Narcisse organized a festival that caters to the whole family. The "Fête de la Solidarité" (Solidarity Fair) was born during the economic downturn. While business people watching to consolidate the economic structure of the square, a group of young people organized the first Day of Solidarity. Their idea was to strengthen the social fabric of the city so that people have reason to celebrate despite the economic environment was difficult and they create links between them in order to overcome obstacles together. The Festival celebrated its 30th anniversary in the summer of 2011.

The programming of the festival included the solidarity between other musical performances, exhibitions and fireworks. A parade of fantastic night has already taken place during the festival, but this was abandoned activated for the 2008 edition because of volunteers. A park for children included games and entertainment organized. The town park gives out game shows organized for the benefit of children.

The decision that the party no longer exists fell in early 2013, following a meeting with the population of the municipality. The lack of volunteers led to the end of the festival that brought new tourists every year for over 30 years.

Industry

The town is known for the making of mattresses, prefabricated homes, and the sale of farm tractors.

Catholic Church

The architecture of the church of Saint-Narcisse transcends in a Gothic style. It was built from 1871 to 1874. The bishop of the diocese of Trois-Rivières, Bishop Louis-François Richer Laflèche chaired the official blessing. In 1894, following a meeting of parishioners, the factory has made purchasing a system with four bells chime (bigger than the previous ones) made in Haute-Savoie, France, that is their teintement heard in the distance by the parishioners. In 1916, the factory decided on a  extension of the church building a new facade with two towers. The factory also allows the acquisition of a Casavant organ. The interior of the church is the work of the painter Monti.

Dupont House

The Dupont House was built in 1871, adjacent to the church. This building has long served as a public meeting place for parishioners on Sundays, especially after church services celebrated in the church. This house of a classic 19th-century style is now owned by the municipality. The historical committee of the parish of Saint-Narcisse administers this historical house. The mission of the Dupont House has been transformed into an arts centre and exhibition hall.

Hydroelectric plant on Batiscan River
The hydroelectric power station of Saint-Narcisse was built between 1895 and 1897 to harness the great falls of the Batiscan River. This plant helped build the first high voltage line of the British Empire and it linked Saint-Narcisse to Trois-Rivières. Electricity Saint-Narcisse fed the electrical distribution system of the city of Trois-Rivières, including street lighting.

In the area of the falls of the Batiscan River, the Batiscan River Park was built in the wilderness, there to practice outdoor activities such as camping, walking the trails, biking, observing of flora and fauna ...

Demographics 

Mother tongue:
English as first language: 0.6%
French as first language: 98.6%
English and French as first language: 0%
Other as first language: 0.8%

Government 

The territory of Saint-Narcisse is part of two old lordships, Lordship of Batiscan and Lordship of Champlain, separated by the path of the "Grande ligne" (Great Line). The municipality was erected on December 29, 1954. A second decree of April 14, 1859 clarified the boundaries of the municipality. On July 25, 1894 Louis-François Richer Laflèche ordered by the detachment of several batches of rows Sainte-Marguerite (lots 790–800) and St. Felix (lots 688–701), the parish of Saint-Maurice to attach them to the parish of Saint-Narcisse.

The parish municipality of Saint-Narcisse is one of the municipalities resulting from the first municipal boundaries of the province of Quebec. Initially part of the Champlain County, Saint-Narcisse was included in the Regional County Municipality of Francheville in 1982. In 2002, the municipality of Saint-Narcisse went to the regional county municipality of Les Chenaux.

Notable people 
 Marcel Trudel (29 May 1917 - 11 January 2011), 93 years, Quebec historian.
 Yanni Gourde, a hockey player with the Seattle Kraken of the National Hockey League.

Further reading 
Repertoires
Répertoire des baptêmes de Saint-Narcisse 1954-1986, 1987, 285 pages, published by "La Société d'histoire de Saint-Narcisse", collection Souvenance.
Saint-Narcisse - Répertoire des mariages de Saint-Narcisse 1854-1985, published by "La Société d'histoire de Saint-Narcisse", 1986, 131 pages, collection Souvenance.
Répertoire des sépultures de Saint-Narcisse 1854-1985, 1986, 155 pages, published by "La Société d'histoire de Saint-Narcisse", collection Souvenance.
Saint-Narcisse: Baptêmes 1987-1991, mariages 1986-1991, sépultures 1986-1991, 1992, 55 pages, published by "Société d'histoire de Saint-Narcisse".
Saint-Narcisse: baptêmes, 1992-2002, mariages, 1992-2002, sépultures, 1992-2002, 2003, published by "La Société d'histoire de Saint-Narcisse" (Historical committee of Saint-Narcisse). 
Saint-Narcisse - Répertoire des mariages de Saint-Narcisse 1854-1985, published by "La Société d'histoire de Saint-Narcisse", 1986, 131 pages.
Recensement de la paroisse de Saint-Narcisse en 1886 (Census of Saint-Narcisse in 1886), archives of Évêché de Trois-Rivières, written by Brigitte Hamel, 1988, 108 pages.

Monographies
Saint-Narcisse 1804-1979, written by Jean Gagnon, Éditions du Bien public, 2001, 325 pages. This parish monograph is richly illustrated of historic photos. 
La vie municipale à Saint-Narcisse 1854-1989, 110 pages, published by "La Société d'histoire de Saint-Narcisse", Édition Souvenance.
Saint-Narcisse-de-Champlain, au pays de la Batiscan, municipalité de Saint-Narcisse, 2001.
Hommage à nos pionnières, published by A.F.E.A.S. of St-Narcisse, Collection "Femmes de chez nous" (Women among us), 71 pages.
Saint-Narcisse 1804-1979 - Album souvenir, 320 pages.
Saint-Narcisse-de-Champlain, Album Souvenir, produced by the organizing committee of the centenary, 1954, 96 pages. 
Retrouvailles, biographies de gens de Saint-Narcisse, written par Jacques Baril, 110 pages.
Le premier barrage Saint-Narcisse 1897-1928, written by Romain Baril and Georges Hamelin, 86 pages.
Le chant liturgique à Saint Narcisse - 1854-1989, 104 pages, written by Claire Cossette, published by "La Société d'histoire de Saint-Narcisse", Édition Souvenance.
St-Narcisse - Histoire du rang St-Félix - En filant vers la station (English: History of St. Félix row), written by Raymonde Descôteaux, 1986, 188 pages. 
Histoire d'un rang, le rang St-Pierre, written by Raymond Drouin, 44 pages, published by "La Société d'histoire de Saint-Narcisse", Édition Souvenance.
Jos Noé Veillette et Aurore Cossette: histoire et généalogie d'une famille d'entrepreneurs forestiers (Jos Noah Veillette and Aurore Cossette: history and genealogy of a family of loggers), historical volume written by Luc Veillette (1939 -), 2012, APLAB Publishing (Trois-Rivières), 242 pages. 
Mes souvenirs, ma vie, ma famille, ma maison, written by Blandine Thibeault, Collection "Femmes de chez nous" (Women among us), 16 pages.
Biographie de Auréa Jacob-Cossette, written by Gabrielle Cossette-Lepage, 16 pages.

See also 

 Saint-Stanislas

References

External links

Parish municipalities in Quebec
Incorporated places in Mauricie
Les Chenaux Regional County Municipality